The Rivière Saint-Denis is a river on the Indian Ocean island of Réunion. It enters the sea close to the island's northernmost point after flowing through the Plaine des Chicots – Plaine d'Affouches Important Bird Area and then the capital, Saint-Denis.

See also
 Bassin du Diable

References

Rivers of Réunion
Saint-Denis, Réunion
Rivers of France